Lock and Dam No. 5A is a lock and dam located near Fountain City, Wisconsin and Goodview, Minnesota on the Upper Mississippi River around river mile 728.5.

Construction 
It was constructed in 1932, placed in operation in 1936. Its last major rehabilitation was from 1989 through 2000.

Description 

Ownership 
The lock and dam are owned and operated by the St. Paul District of the United States Army Corps of Engineers-Mississippi Valley Division.

See also
 Public Works Administration Dams list
 Upper Mississippi River National Wildlife and Fish Refuge

References

External links
U.S. Army Corps of Engineers, St. Paul District: Lock and Dam 5A
U.S. Army Corps of Engineers, St. Paul District: Lock and Dam 5A brochure

Buildings and structures in Buffalo County, Wisconsin
Dams in Minnesota
Dams in Wisconsin
Historic American Engineering Record in Minnesota
Historic American Engineering Record in Wisconsin
Driftless Area
Mississippi River locks
Buildings and structures in Winona County, Minnesota
Transportation in Winona County, Minnesota
United States Army Corps of Engineers dams
Transport infrastructure completed in 1936
Roller dams
Gravity dams
Dams on the Mississippi River
Mississippi Valley Division
1936 establishments in Minnesota
1936 establishments in Wisconsin
Locks of Minnesota
Locks of Wisconsin